INDIAai is a web portal launched by the Government of India in May 2022 for artificial intelligence related developments in India. It is known as the National AI Portal of India, which was jointly started by the Ministry of Electronics and Information Technology (MeitY), the National e-Governance Division (NeGD) and the National Association of Software and Service Companies (NASSCOM) with support from the Department of School Education and Literacy (DoSE&L) and Ministry of Human Resource Development.

History 
The portal was launched on May 30, 2020, by Ravi Shankar Prasad, the Union Minister for Electronics and IT, Law and Justice and Communications, on the first anniversary of the second tenure of Prime Minister Narendra Modi-led government. A national program for the youth, 'Responsible AI for Youth', was also launched on the same day.  

As of 2022, the website was visited by more than 4.5 lakh users with 1.2 million page views. It has 1151 articles on artificial intelligence, 701 news stories, 98 reports, 95 case studies and 213 videos on its portal. It maintains a database on AI ecosystem of India featuring 121 government initiatives and 281 startups. In May 2022, INDIAai released a book on AI basics titled AI for Everyone.

Objective and features 
It aims to function as a one-stop portal for all AI-related development in India. The platform publishes resources like articles, news, interviews, and investment funding news and events for AI startups, AI companies and educational firms on artificial intelligence in India. It also distributes documents, case studies, research reports and provides education and employment opportunities related to AI. It has made available AI courses, both free and paid.

References 

Internet properties established in 2020
2020 establishments in India
Computer-related introductions in 2020
Artificial intelligence
Ministry of Communications and Information Technology (India)
Internet in India
E-government in India
Modi administration initiatives
Government services web portals in India
News agencies based in India